Neal Burns (June 26, 1892 – October 3, 1969) was an American film actor, screenwriter, and director. He appeared in more than 200 films between 1915 and 1946.

Burns was born in Bristol, Pennsylvania and attended public schools in Atlantic City. He died in Los Angeles, California. He was the younger brother of fellow actor Eddie Barry. 

Burns's work on stage included acting with the Gaiety Company at the Morosco Theater in Los Angeles in 1914.

In 1918, Burns was a drill sergeant in the Army at Camp Lewis.

Selected filmography
 Phoney Photos (1918)
 Hickory Hiram (1918)
 Mary's Ankle (1920)
 Divorce Made Easy (1929) (director)
 Sob Sister (1931)
 Kickin' the Crown Around (1933)
 Behold My Wife! (1934)
 The Face of Marble (1946)

References

External links

Neal Burns at Virtual History

1892 births
1969 deaths
People from Bristol, Pennsylvania
American male film actors
American male screenwriters
Male actors from Pennsylvania
Film directors from Pennsylvania
20th-century American male actors
Screenwriters from Pennsylvania
20th-century American male writers
20th-century American screenwriters